The 2009 Wimbledon Championships are described below in detail, in the form of day-by-day summaries.

Day 1 (22 June)
The first day of Wimbledon 2009 saw the early withdrawal of defending champion and number 1 seed Rafael Nadal due to injury. Instead, 2008 Men's Singles runner-up and five-time Wimbledon Champion Roger Federer opened on Centre Court, winning his first round match in straight sets. Amongst the first day's winners were 2008 Australian Open Champion Novak Djokovic, 2009 French Open finalist Robin Söderling, Fernando Verdasco, Marin Čilić, Ivo Karlović, Jo-Wilfried Tsonga, Mardy Fish and former French Open champion Guillermo Cañas. Spanish player Nicolás Almagro survived a five set match against Juan Mónaco despite losing the first two sets,    6–4, 8–6. Two matches were suspended on the first day: the match between Michaël Llodra and Josh Goodall, and the match between Tommy Haas and Alexander Peya. However, the first major upset of the tournament came when Italy's Andreas Seppi defeated Queen's Club finalist James Blake in straight sets, 7–5, 6–4, 

In the women's side of the draw, last year's finalist and two-time Wimbledon Champion Serena Williams easily won in straight sets; she was joined by Shahar Pe'er, Jill Craybas, Urszula Radwańska, Russian players Elena Dementieva, Alisa Kleybanova, Elena Vesnina, Nadia Petrova, and Anastasia Pavlyuchenkova, 2004 Wimbledon Champion Maria Sharapova, and 2008 semi-finalist Jie Zheng. Slovakian player Daniela Hantuchová won a three set thriller against last year's Girls Singles Champion and Britain's young prodigy Laura Robson, 3–6, 6–4, 6–2, while former finalist Marion Bartoli scored the first double bagel of the tournament against Taipei's Chan Yung-jan. The 2009 Ordina Open Champion Tamarine Tanasugarn lost to Arantxa Parra Santonja in straight sets, but the major upset was when Ai Sugiyama defeated Patty Schnyder in straight sets.

 Seeds out:
 Men's Singles:  James Blake [17],  Feliciano López [21]
 Women's Singles:  Patty Schnyder [21],  Aleksandra Wozniak [23]
 Schedule of Play

Day 2 (23 June)
In the men's singles 2008 US Open finalist Andy Murray advanced to the second round, and he was joined by two-time Wimbledon finalist Andy Roddick, 2003 French Open Champion Juan Carlos Ferrero, Juan Martín del Potro, Gilles Simon, Tommy Haas, 2002 Wimbledon Champion Lleyton Hewitt, Nikolay Davydenko, David Ferrer, and Stan Wawrinka. "The Magician" Fabrice Santoro, who was competing in his last Wimbledon, scored a straight set victory over Nicolas Kiefer, 6–4, 6–2, 6–2. Three retirements were recorded on the men's side, with Denis Istomin retiring against Fabio Fognini, Grigor Dimitrov retiring against Igor Kunitsyn, and Dmitry Tursunov retiring against Mischa Zverev. Nicolas Devilder fought off a five set thriller against Nicolás Lapentti, 3–6, 6–4, 6–3, 4–6, 7–5. Marat Safin was upset by Jesse Levine in four sets, 6–2, 3–6, 7–6(7–4), 6–4.

In the women's side five-time Wimbledon Champion Venus Williams got through in straight sets against Stefanie Vögele 6–3 6–2. She was joined in the second round by World No. 1 Dinara Safina, 2009 French Open Champion Svetlana Kuznetsova, former World No. 1 Jelena Janković, Vera Zvonareva, Caroline Wozniacki, Li Na, Shuai Peng, Agnieszka Radwańska, Flavia Pennetta, Carla Suárez Navarro, Samantha Stosur, Maria Kirilenko, and Sabine Lisicki. Two former World No. 1 and Grand Slam champions were pushed to their limit, with Ana Ivanovic prevailing over Lucie Hradecká, 5–7, 6–2, 8–6, and 2006 Champion Amélie Mauresmo triumphed against Melinda Czink, 6–1, 4–6, 6–2.

In the Men's Doubles, second seeds Daniel Nestor and Nenad Zimonjić won their first round, while sixth seed Mariusz Fyrstenberg and Marcin Matkowski were upset by Americans Eric Butorac and Scott Lipsky in straight sets, 6–3, 6–3, 6–3. The Women's Doubles sixth seeds Daniela Hantuchová and Ai Sugiyama got through the first round, and were joined by Shahar Pe'er and Gisela Dulko.

 Seeds out:
 Men's Singles:  Marat Safin [14],  Dmitry Tursunov [25],  Nicolas Kiefer [33]
 Women's Singles:  Alizé Cornet [22],  Kaia Kanepi [25],  Sybille Bammer [29],  Ágnes Szávay [30],  Anna Chakvetadze [32]
 Men's Doubles:  Mariusz Fyrstenberg /  Marcin Matkowski [6]
 Schedule of Play

Day 3 (24 June)
 Seeds out:
 Men's Singles:  Rainer Schüttler [18]
 Women's Singles:  Zheng Jie [16],  Maria Sharapova [24],  Alisa Kleybanova [27],   Anastasia Pavlyuchenkova [31]
 Men's Doubles:  Rik de Voest /  Ashley Fisher [14],  Stephen Huss /  Ross Hutchins [16]
 Women's Doubles:  Maria Kirilenko /  Flavia Pennetta [8] /  Nathalie Dechy /  Mara Santangelo [14]
 Schedule of Play

Day 4 (25 June)
 Seeds out:
 Men's Singles:  Juan Martín del Potro [5]
 Men's Doubles:  Lukáš Dlouhý /  Leander Paes [3],  Jeff Coetzee /  Jordan Kerr [12]
 Women's Doubles:  Hsieh Su-wei /  Peng Shuai [5],  Lisa Raymond /  Vera Zvonareva [9]
 Schedule of Play

Day 5 (26 June)
 Seeds out:
 Men's Singles:  Jo-Wilfried Tsonga [9],  Tommy Robredo [15],  Philipp Kohlschreiber [27],  Mardy Fish 28],  Albert Montañés [31]
 Women's Singles:  Marion Bartoli [12],  Dominika Cibulková [14],  Sorana Cîrstea [28]
 Men's Doubles:  Marcelo Melo /  André Sá [11],  František Čermák /  Michal Mertiňák [13]
 Schedule of Play

Day 6 (27 June)
 Seeds out:
 Men's Singles:  Fernando González [10],  Marin Čilić [11],  Nikolay Davydenko [12],  Jürgen Melzer [26],  Viktor Troicki [30]
 Women's Singles:  Svetlana Kuznetsova [5],  Jelena Janković [13],  Flavia Pennetta [15],  Samantha Stosur [18],  Li Na [19],  Anabel Medina Garrigues [20]
 Men's Doubles:  Travis Parrott /  Filip Polášek [10]
 Women's Doubles:  Daniela Hantuchová /  Ai Sugiyama [6],  Chuang Chia-jung /  Sania Mirza [15],  Svetlana Kuznetsova /  Amélie Mauresmo [16]
 Mixed Doubles:  Nenad Zimonjić /  Yan Zi [10],  Marcelo Melo /  Peng Shuai [14]
 Schedule of Play

Middle Sunday (28 June)
Middle Sunday in Wimbledon is traditionally a rest day, without any play, and this was the case in 2009. The seventh day of the competition, consequently, fell on Monday 29 June.

Day 7 (29 June)
 Seeds out:
 Men's Singles:  Fernando Verdasco [7],  Gilles Simon [8],  Robin Söderling [13],  Stan Wawrinka [19],  Tomáš Berdych [20],  Radek Štěpánek [23],  Igor Andreev [29]
 Women's Singles:  Caroline Wozniacki [9],  Nadia Petrova [10],  Ana Ivanovic [13],  Amélie Mauresmo [17],  Virginie Razzano [26]
 Men's Doubles:  Martin Damm /  Robert Lindstedt [15]
 Women's Doubles:  Victoria Azarenka /  Elena Vesnina [7],  Bethanie Mattek-Sands /  Nadia Petrova [10],  Yan Zi /  Zheng Jie [13]
 Mixed Doubles:  Marcin Matkowski /  Lisa Raymond [3],  Mahesh Bhupathi /  Sania Mirza [13]
 Schedule of Play

Day 8 (30 June)
 Seeds out:
 Women's Singles:  Victoria Azarenka [8],  Agnieszka Radwańska [11]
 Men's Doubles:  Bruno Soares /  Kevin Ullyett [5],  Max Mirnyi /  Andy Ram [7],  Łukasz Kubot /  Oliver Marach [8]
 Mixed Doubles:  Robert Lindstedt /  Rennae Stubbs [7],  Max Mirnyi /  Nadia Petrova [8]
 Schedule of Play

Day 9 (1 July)
 Seeds out:
 Men's Singles:  Novak Djokovic [4],  Ivo Karlović [22]
 Men's Doubles:  Mahesh Bhupathi /  Mark Knowles [4]
 Women's Doubles:  Nuria Llagostera Vives /  María José Martínez Sánchez [11] /  Anna-Lena Grönefeld /  Vania King [12]
 Mixed Doubles:  Daniel Nestor /  Elena Vesnina [5],  Mike Bryan /  Bethanie Mattek-Sands [6],  Christopher Kas /  Chuang Chia-jung [16]
 Schedule of Play

Day 10 (2 July)
 Seeds out:
 Women's Singles:  Dinara Safina [1],  Elena Dementieva [4]
 Men's Doubles:  Wesley Moodie /  Dick Norman [9]
 Mixed Doubles:  Bob Bryan /  Samantha Stosur [2],  Kevin Ullyett /  Hsieh Su-wei [3],  André Sá /  Ai Sugiyama [11]
 Schedule of Play

Day 11 (3 July)
 Seeds out:
 Men's Singles:  Andy Murray [3],  Tommy Haas [24]
 Women's Doubles:  Cara Black /  Liezel Huber [1],  Anabel Medina Garrigues /  Virginia Ruano Pascual [2]
 Mixed Doubles:  Stephen Huss /  Virginia Ruano Pascual [12]
 Schedule of Play

Day 12 (4 July)
 Seeds out:
 Women's Singles:  Venus Williams [3]
 Men's Doubles:  Bob Bryan /  Mike Bryan [1]
 Women's Doubles:  Samantha Stosur /  Rennae Stubbs [3]
 Schedule of Play

Day 13 (5 July)

Roger Federer won his sixth Wimbledon title defeated Andy Roddick in five sets, Federer surpassed Pete Sampras as the all-time Grand Slam record of 15 titles and reclaimed the ATP world no. 1 from Nadal.
 Seeds out:
 Men's Singles:  Andy Roddick [6]
 Mixed Doubles:  Leander Paes /  Cara Black [1]
 Schedule of Play

References

Wimbledon Championships by year – Day-by-day summaries